Robert Smith was a Scottish footballer who played as an inside forward mainly for Doncaster Rovers.

Playing career
Smith is both reported as coming from "a Fifeshire junior club" and Raith Rovers as being his previous club to Doncaster.

Doncaster Rovers
He moved to Doncaster Rovers in September 1929, scoring on his debut at Chesterfield in a 2–1 defeat on 28 September.

In December 1935, Smith was in the Doncaster team that played their first game against a club from outside the British Isles when they entertained F.C. Austria of Vienna, a game they eventually lost 1–2. He was also in the first Rovers side to venture abroad when they played a friendly against the Dutch International XI on 21 October 1936 at the Sparta Rotterdam Arena, losing 7–2.

At the end of the 1936–37 season as Rovers dropped back to Division 3 (North), manager Fred Emery decided to have a clear out including giving Smith a free transfer. Over his eight seasons at the club he made a total of 275 league and cup appearances, scoring 39 times.

Honours
Doncaster Rovers
Third Division North
Champions 1934–35

References

Year of birth missing
Year of death missing
Footballers from Kirkcaldy
Scottish footballers
Association football forwards
Raith Rovers F.C. players
Doncaster Rovers F.C. players
English Football League players